Brad Rutherford is a Canadian politician elected in the 2019 Alberta general election to represent the electoral district of Leduc-Beaumont in the 30th Alberta Legislature.

Prior to his election to the Legislative Assembly, Rutherford served as a Constable on the Edmonton Police Service and spent two years in the Canadian Armed Forces reserves.

References

United Conservative Party MLAs
Living people
21st-century Canadian politicians
Year of birth missing (living people)